Canthon simplex is a species in the beetle family Scarabaeidae. It is found in North America.

Subspecies
These two subspecies belong to the species Canthon simplex:
 Canthon simplex militaris
 Canthon simplex simplex

References

Further reading

 

Deltochilini
Articles created by Qbugbot
Beetles described in 1857